Dragonheart is a 1996 fantasy adventure film, starring Dennis Quaid and featuring the voice of Sean Connery.

Dragonheart may also refer to:
The Dragonheart (franchise) franchise related to the 1996 film
titles related to the 1996 film:
DragonHeart: Fire & Steel, a 1996 video game based on the movie
Dragonheart: A New Beginning, the 2000 sequel to the 1996 film
Dragonheart 3: The Sorcerer's Curse, the 2015 prequel to the 1996 film
Dragonheart: Battle for the Heartfire, the 2017 prequel to the 1996 film
Dragonheart: Vengeance, the 2020 prequel to the 1996 film
Dragonheart, a 2003 CD release of live concert by Elvis Presley 
Dragonheart (novel), a 2008 Dragonriders of Pern novel written by Todd McCaffrey
Dragon Heart, a 2015 fantasy novel by Cecelia Holland
DragonForce, an English power metal band formerly known as DragonHeart